Wallander – Tjuven (The Thief) is a 2009 film / television drama about the Swedish police detective Kurt Wallander directed by Stephan Apelgren. Tjuven was released to DVD and broadcast as part of the second series of the Wallander (Swedish TV series), as episode 4 of 13.

Synopsis 
Some homes are burgled and a vigilante group is formed. Soon Wallander is convinced that a double murder has occurred, although no bodies have been found.

Cast 
Krister Henriksson as Kurt Wallander
Lena Endre as Katarina Ahlsell
Sverrir Gudnason as Pontus
Nina Zanjani as Isabelle
Fredrik Gunnarsson as Svartman
Mats Bergman as Nyberg
Douglas Johansson as Martinsson
Stina Ekblad as Karin
Henny Åman as Hanna, Katarina's daughter
Jacob Ericksson as Olle
Shanti Roney as Ralf
Kalle Westerdahl as Peter
Karin Lithman as Anne
Kola Krauze as Jarek
Vera Veljovic-Jovanovic as Maja
Harald Leander as Journalist
Max Lindmaa as Hooligan

References

External links 

Swedish crime films
Tjuven
2009 films
2000s crime films
Police detective films
Films directed by Stephan Apelgren
2000s police procedural films
2000s Swedish films